Wang Lianzheng (15 October 1930 – 12 December 2018) was a Chinese agronomist and politician. He served as President of the Chinese Academy of Agricultural Sciences, Vice Governor of Heilongjiang Province, and Vice Minister of Agriculture. An expert in soybean breeding and genetics, he was elected a foreign fellow of the Russian Academy of Agricultural Sciences and of the Indian National Academy of Agricultural Sciences.

Early life 
Wang was born on 15 October 1930 in Haicheng, Liaoning, China. After graduating from Northeast Agricultural University in 1954, he worked for the Ministry of Forestry of China and then Heilongjiang Academy of Agricultural Sciences. In October 1960, he went to the Soviet Union to study at Moscow Timiryazev Agricultural Academy. After earning a doctoral degree, in October 1962, he returned to Heilongjiang Academy of Agricultural Sciences where he worked as a research scientist.

Career 
During the Cultural Revolution, Wang was persecuted and forced to perform hard labour. He was rehabilitated and returned to work in February 1970 and served as Director of the Soybean Research Institute of Heilongjiang Academy of Agricultural Sciences, and later Vice President and then President of the academy.

In February 1980, Wang was appointed Vice Governor of Heilongjiang Province, while concurrently serving as President of Heilongjiang Academy of Agricultural Sciences. From December 1987 to November 1994, he served as the fourth President of the Chinese Academy of Agricultural Sciences. From December 1988 to April 1991, he concurrently served as China's Vice Minister of Agriculture. He was elected a delegate to the 9th National People's Congress.

Wang was an expert in soybean breeding and genetics. He developed more than 34 soybean cultivars, which have been planted to 150 million mu of farmland. He published more than 170 scientific papers and the monographs Genetics and Cultivation of Soybean and Modern Chinese Soybean. He was awarded the State Science and Technology Progress Award (First Class) once and the State Technological Invention Award (Second Class) twice. He was elected a foreign fellow of the Russian Academy of Agricultural Sciences in 1988 and of the Indian National Academy of Agricultural Sciences in 1994.

Death 
Wang died on 12 December 2018 in Beijing, at the age of 88.

References

Further reading
Professor Wang Lianzheng's Soybean Breeding Achievements: from Northeast to North of China Soybean Science, June 2010

1930 births
2018 deaths
Chinese agronomists
People from Haicheng, Liaoning
Scientists from Liaoning
Northeast Agricultural University alumni
Chinese expatriates in the Soviet Union
Victims of the Cultural Revolution
Political office-holders in Heilongjiang
Delegates to the 9th National People's Congress
Fellows of the National Academy of Agricultural Sciences
People's Republic of China politicians from Liaoning
Politicians from Anshan